Cannery Rodent is a 1967 Tom and Jerry cartoon produced, written and directed by Chuck Jones. It was the final Tom and Jerry cartoon written and directed by Chuck Jones, and one of the last of the theatrical Tom and Jerry cartoons to be released by MGM.

Plot
Tom chases Jerry onto a dock, and as they soon both end up in a cannery, they end up being put into cans during the opening credits. As Jerry in his can rolls out of the way, Tom is carried out by the rolling fish cans and off the pier, until he glides through the air and stops as his tail, then his arm, and then his body register that gravity is imminent. Tom dangles in midair, has his face stretched, and finally falls into the sea, where he is nearly eaten by a shark, in response to the shark laughing evilly at him after narrowly escaping, he drops an anchor on the shark's head, the shark rants angrily in gibberish before going back into the sea.

Tom returns to chasing the mouse when he hears his can clattering across the wood floor. Jerry stops at Tom's foot, and leaps into the air, but is then caught and opened. The cat repeatedly shakes the open can to get the mouse out of it with no results, and sticks a finger inside to get bitten by the mouse, with painful results. He finally pulls Jerry out of the can, and as both of them realize the situation, Jerry releases his death grip, shows his smile to the camera, and kicks Tom's face as he starts the chase.

Tom swims out of the way with the shark continues to snap at him. The cat climbs a ladder while the shark eats through the wood columns under the pier. The shark swims back and takes a leap toward the cat on top of the pier and gets smacked on the head with an oar before falling back into the water. He emerges and glares at Tom as the cat taunts him once again, only this time, the shark leaps out of the water and grabs Tom (and part of the pier decking) in his jaws. Jerry peers through the resulting hole at the terrifying situation below: Tom is hanging onto an oar, which braces the shark's mouth open.

Jerry in the matter of choice opens a shaker of pepper in which pepper flies into the sharks mouth causing him to sneeze instantly. He flies through the water and into the canning factory. He himself gets trapped into a large can and is seen as a logo with a gloomy look on his face. It is unknown that he has survived.

As Jerry relaxes and obtains a halo for his good deed, an ungrateful Tom grabs him and pops Jerry's halo with devil horns that appear on his head, chuckling evilly. Jerry chuckles innocently and sneezes himself out of the cat's paw, off his horns, and into the water, immediately followed by the cat. Tom's searching on the scene, only to become terrified when he screams that he has found another shark fin on a beeline coming towards him, he panics terribly and swims away with lightning speed with the fin keeping pace. The shark fin is revealed to be a fake fin held by Jerry who is swimming underwater as a prank to torture Tom. Devil horns then appear on Jerry's head as he continues to chase Tom.

Production notes
The title is a play-on-words of the John Steinbeck novel Cannery Row.

External links

1967 films
1967 short films
Tom and Jerry short films
1967 animated films
Short films directed by Chuck Jones
Animated films without speech
1960s American animated films
1967 comedy films
Films scored by Dean Elliott
Films directed by Maurice Noble
American comedy short films
Metro-Goldwyn-Mayer short films
Metro-Goldwyn-Mayer animated short films
Films about sharks
MGM Animation/Visual Arts short films
1960s English-language films